Emmanuel Vaudan (born December 21, 1971) from Monthey is a Swiss ski mountaineer and long-distance runner.

Selected results

Ski mountaineering 
 2001:
 3rd, Swiss Cup, scratch (and 2nd seniors)
 2002:
 2nd, Trophée de la Tête de Balme team race (together with Pierre-Marie Taramarcaz)
 2nd, Diamir-Race, Diemtig valley (together with Christian Pittex)
 2nd, Trophée du Muveran (together with  Christian Pittex)
 3rd, Suisse Cup
 2005:
 5th, European Championship vertical race
 10th, European Championship team race (together with Yannick Ecoeur)
 2008:
 2nd, Kilomètre Vertical de Fully race
 2011:
 1st, Zermatt-Rothorn mountain run

Patrouille des Glaciers 

 2004: 5th, together with Pius Schuwey and Didier Moret
 2006: 5th (and 3rd in  "senior I" class ranking), together with Alain Rey and Marcel Marti

Running 
 2003:
 1st, Jeizibärg-Lauf, Gampel
 2004:
 3rd (men II), Jeizibärg-Lauf, Gampel
 2005:
 1st (men II), Jeizibärg-Lauf, Gampel
 1st, Jeizibärg-Lauf & Dérupe Vercorin Trophy
 1st, half marathon within the Mystery Inferno
 2006:
 1st, Jeizibärg-Lauf & Dérupe Vercorin Trophy
 2nd, Jeizibärg-Lauf, Gampel
 3rd, half marathon within the Mystery Inferno
 2007:
 1st, Jeizibärg-Lauf, Gampel
 1st, half marathon within the AlpenMarathon – Marathon des Alpages
 2008:
 3rd, Dérupe Vercorin
 2010:
 3rd, Jeizibärg-Lauf / Mountain Running Cup, Gampel
 2011:
 1st, Trail Verbier-St Bernard - "La Traversée", 61 km
 2011:
 1st, and overall record, climbing 1723 m altitude in 55 minutes 55 seconds

External links 
 Emmanuel Vaudan at skimountaineering.com

References 

1971 births
Living people
Swiss male ski mountaineers
Swiss male long-distance runners
Swiss mountain runners
Swiss ultramarathon runners
People from Monthey
Male ultramarathon runners
Sportspeople from Valais